Elissoma is a genus of flies in the family Stratiomyidae.

Species
Elissoma brunnea Hardy, 1933
Elissoma lauta White, 1916

References

Stratiomyidae
Brachycera genera
Diptera of Australasia